This is a list of airfields of the military aviation division of the British Army, the Army Air Corps, from 1 September 1957.

Current airfields
Wattisham Airfield – the biggest centralised operational Army airfield in the UK, formerly RAF Wattisham
RNAS Yeovilton (HMS Heron)
AAC Middle Wallop – formerly RAF Middle Wallop
Joint Helicopter Command Flying Station Aldergrove – formerly RAF Aldergrove
Stirling Lines – formerly RAF Credenhill
RAF Barkston Heath

Previous airfields

 Sha Tin Airfield, Hong Kong (1950s–1970s) – formerly RAF Shatin
 AAC Netheravon, Wiltshire (1964–2012) – formerly RAF Netheravon, now used by the Joint Services Parachute Centre
 Alanbrooke Barracks, North Yorkshire (70's–1992) – formerly RAF Topcliffe, now used by 4th Regiment Royal Artillery
 Dishforth Airfield, North Yorkshire (1992–2016) – formerly RAF Dishforth, now used by 6 Regiment RLC

See also
List of Royal Air Force stations
List of V Bomber dispersal bases
List of Battle of Britain airfields
List of UK Thor missile bases
List of air stations of the Royal Navy
Lists of military installations
List of airports in the United Kingdom and the British Crown Dependencies
 List of British Army installations

References

External links

Army Air Corps official website
UK "Secret Bases" 

 
Army Air Corps
UK Air Corps
Army Air Corps